Camilla Neptune (born 25 May 1962) is a former Swedish footballer. Neptune was a member of the Swedish national team that won the 1984 European Competition for Women's Football.

References

1962 births
Living people
Sunnanå SK players
Damallsvenskan players
Swedish women's footballers
Sweden women's international footballers
Women's association football midfielders
UEFA Women's Championship-winning players